Ghodbunder Fort is a fort located in Ghodbunder Village, Thane, Maharashtra, India, on the hill just south of the Ulhas River.  It was built by the Portuguese, occupied by the Maratha Empire, and became the East India Company's district headquarters.  The place was called Ghodbunder because it was where the Portuguese used to trade for ghode (horses) with the Arabs. Hence the name Ghodbunder: ghode (horses) & bunder (port).

In 1530 the Portuguese came to Thane, and they began fortifying the hill area about 1550, but completion of the fort in its current form was in 1730. The Portuguese name for the fort was Cacabe de Tanna.  It was under Portuguese rule until 1737. The Portuguese built a church in the fort that still stands, and is now used as a hotel.  Two angels engraved on the inside wall of the church still remains. The old church can be seen clearly in the background of the courtyard photo.

There are many old maps and texts which mention continual attempts by the Marathas to capture this fort. The Portuguese were able to defend Ghodbunder Fort from these attacks successfully for many years, including the attack in 1672 by the powerful forces of Chhatrapati Shivaji Maharaj.However, the Marathas under Chimnaji Appa successfully besieged the fort and took it over from the Portuguese in 1737. Following its capture, Sambhaji ordered the strengthening of the fortifications, initiating the construction of the tower.

In 1818, the British occupied the fort and made it the headquarters of the district administration for the East Indian Company, with a district collector stationed in Thane.

Although the fort currently lies in ruins, the government of India has started its renovation. The fort itself is under the control of the Archaeological Survey of India (ASI).

References 

Forts in Maharashtra
Portuguese forts in India
History of Thane district
Tourist attractions in Thane district
1550s establishments in Portuguese India
1730s in Portuguese India
16th-century forts in India
17th-century forts in India
Forts around Mumbai